This is the list of episodes for La CQ, the first Cartoon Network Latin American original live-action series. It is created by Pedro Ortíz de Pinedo. All the episodes are directed by Sergio Adrián Sánchez "El Venado" and co-authored by Luis Bautista "Jurgan".

Series overview

Episodes

Pilot (2006)

Season 1 (2012)

Season 2 (2012–13)

Season 3 (2013)

Season 4 (2013–14)

References

La CQ
Lists of sitcom episodes
Lists of Cartoon Network television series episodes
2010s television-related lists